Cherry Valley is a city in Cross County, Arkansas, United States. The population was 651 at the 2010 census.

Geography
Cherry Valley is located in northern Cross County at  (35.403666, -90.752742), at the western edge of Crowleys Ridge. Arkansas Highway 1 leads south  to Wynne, the county seat, and north  to Harrisburg.

Demographics

As of the census of 2000, there were 704 people, 276 households, and 197 families residing in the city. The racial makeup of the city was 92.33% White, 5.97% Black or African American, 0.57% Native American, 0.14% Asian, and 0.99% from two or more races. 0.28% of the population were Hispanic or Latino of any race.

There were 276 households, out of which 32.6% had children under the age of 18 living with them, 54.7% were married couples living together, 12.3% had a female householder with no husband present, and 28.6% were non-families. 26.8% of all households were made up of individuals, and 14.5% had someone living alone who was 65 years of age or older. The average household size was 2.55 and the average family size was 3.09.

In the city, the population was spread out, with 28.0% under the age of 18, 9.5% from 18 to 24, 27.1% from 25 to 44, 22.6% from 45 to 64, and 12.8% who were 65 years of age or older. The median age was 35 years. For every 100 females, there were 88.7 males. For every 100 females age 18 and over, there were 85.0 males.

The median income for a household in the city was $27,313, and the median income for a family was $31,094. Males had a median income of $26,324 versus $20,114 for females. The per capita income for the city was $16,592. About 18.1% of families and 18.5% of the population were below the poverty line, including 27.8% of those under age 18 and 19.8% of those age 65 or over.

Education 
Public education for elementary and secondary students is provided by the Cross County School District, which leads to graduation from Cross County High School. The district's mascot and athletic emblem is the Thunderbird.

The Cross County district was established in 1965 by the merger of the Cherry Valley, Hickory Ridge, and Vanndale school districts. As a part of the Cross County district the community previously had its own elementary school, Cherry Valley Elementary.

Notable people
 Pat Hare, blues musician
 Paul H. Young, fly fishing innovator
 Jeff Martin, professional basketball player
 Wayne Martin, professional football player

References 

Cities in Arkansas
Cities in Cross County, Arkansas